Gav Kuh (also Romanized as Gāv Kūh and Gāvkūh) is a village in Aliyan Rural District, Sardar-e Jangal District, Fuman County, Gilan Province, Iran. At the 2006 census, its population was 81, in 25 families.

References 

Populated places in Fuman County